Carlos Andrés Tromben Reyes (born 23 July 1966) is a Chilean journalist and writer. 

In 2021, he refused to run for a seat in the Constitutional Convention. However, he has defended the key proposals of the Convention.

Biography
Son of the ship captain and naval historian, Carlos Tromben Corbalán, and Gloria Reyes Ojeda, Tromben studied at the French College of Vina del Mar, currently, the French Alliance, which in those years was close to the Quinta Vergara. Then he finished his BA and received as a business administrator at the Pontifical Catholic University of Valparaíso (PUCV). Similarly, he studied journalism and communication at the Higher School of Commerce in Paris (2001−2002).

Tromben made his debut in literature in 2003, when he won the El Mercurio Book Magazine contest with his first novel, Poderes Fácticos, a police novel based on a real event: the double homicide of a painter and his partner that occurred in April 1973 in an apartment on Rosal Street. It was followed, two years later, by another crime novel, Prácticas Rituales (Ritual Practices), and in 2006, Karma, a complex novel that was well received by critics and about which Camilo Marks said that he didn't consider it as his favorite 'fiction novel, but also one of the most entertaining, ambitious, visionary works published in Chile in recent times'.

After La Casa de Electra (2010) —a spy thriller set during World War II with a woman as the protagonist—, in 2015, Tromben published Huáscar, a historical novel that describes the capture of the legendary Peruvian monitor. This work, also commented by the National History Prize Eduardo Cavieres, became the second best-selling book at the 2016 Lima International Book Fair. His second historical novel, Balmaceda, appeared in 2016. The same year he released the novel Crónicas secretas de la economía chilena (Secret chronicle of the Chilean economy), which analyzes the privatization of state companies from 1974 to 1994, as well as the origin of Sebastián Piñera's fortune.

His success as a fiction writer was consolidated in 2017 with his third historical novel, Santa María de Iquique, about the massacre at the school of the same name of entire families —Bolivian, Chilean and Peruvian—, murdered by soldiers of the Chilean Army in December 1907. The work has been on the list of best sellers and was selected as one of the best books of the year by a group of ten critics and cultural journalists. The same year, he also published La Señora de Dolor, a remake of Karma, which, in Tromben's words, 'is not a 2.0 version of that book, but another novel', because 'they are the same characters, but located in a parallel universe, similar, but not identical'.

Works

Fiction
 Poderes fácticos, policial novel, Mercurio Aguilar, 2003
 Prácticas rituales, policial novel, Alfaguara, 2005 
 Karma, novel, Seix Barral, 2006
 Perdidos en el espacio I, stories, Calabaza del Diablo, 2008
 La Casa de Electra, thriller, Alfaguara, 2010 
 Perdidos en el espacio II, stories, Calabaza del Diablo, 2011
 Huáscar, Historical novel, Ediciones B, 2015 (Estruendomudo, Lima, 2016)
 Balmaceda, Historical novel, Ediciones B, 2016
 La señora de dolor; Ediciones B, 2017
 Santa María de Iquique, la muerte de la República,  Historical novel, Ediciones B, 2017
 El vino de Dios, Thriller, Ediciones B, 2019

No-fiction
 Crónica secreta de la economía chilena, Essay, Ediciones B, 2016
 Pescado Rabioso, Essay, Ediciones B, 2018
 Brevario del Neoliberalismo, Essay, Mandrágora, 2019

References

1966 births
Living people
Chilean journalists
Chilean people of German descent
21st-century Chilean male writers
Writers from Valparaiso
Pontifical Catholic University of Valparaíso alumni
21st-century Chilean novelists

Chilean male novelists